Harmologa columella is a species of moth of the family Tortricidae. It is found in New Zealand.

The wingspan is about 21 mm. The forewings are whitish mixed with light violet grey and some ferruginous strigulae (fine streaks). There are four dark violet-grey on the costa. The hindwings are grey, somewhat darker posteriorly.

References

Moths described in 1927
Archipini
Moths of New Zealand
Endemic fauna of New Zealand
Taxa named by Edward Meyrick
Endemic moths of New Zealand